Silvia Nenning (3 September 1968) is an Austrian former cyclist. She won the Austrian National Road Race Championships in 1990 and 1991.

References

External links
 

1968 births
Living people
Austrian female cyclists
Place of birth missing (living people)